Shirin Bina is an Iranian theater, cinema and TV actress born on August 20, 1964 Marand, Iran.

Filmography

References

 
 Shirin Bina in Internet database of Soureh Cinema
 Shirin Bina in iFilm
 Shirin Bina in IranAct
 Shirin Bina in filcin

External links

Iranian film actresses
Living people
Iranian stage actresses
Iranian television actresses
People from Marand
1964 births
Islamic Azad University alumni
20th-century Iranian actresses
21st-century Iranian actresses